Keewatin Tribal Council is a tribal council representing 11 First Nation band governments in the province of Manitoba. Its head offices are located in Thompson, Manitoba, with a secondary office in Winnipeg.

Members
The Keewatin Tribal Council represents the following First Nation band governments (registered populations as of August 2013):
Barren Lands First Nation — offices in Brochet, Manitoba; registered population was 1,088. 
Bunibonibee Cree Nation — offices in Oxford House, Manitoba; registered population was 2,892. 
Fox Lake Cree Nation — offices in Gillam, Manitoba; registered population was 1,165. 
God's Lake First Nation — offices in Gods Lake Narrows, Manitoba; registered population was 2,603. 
Manto Sipi Cree Nation — offices in Gods River, Manitoba; registered population was 646. 
Northlands Dene First Nation — offices in Lac Brochet, Manitoba; registered population was 1,035.
Sayisi Dene First Nation — offices in Tadoule Lake, Manitoba; registered population was 774.
Shamattawa First Nation — offices in Shamattawa, Manitoba; registered population was 1,508. 
Tataskweyak Cree Nation — offices in Split Lake, Manitoba; registered population was 3,582.
War Lake First Nation — offices in Ilford, Manitoba; registered population was 286.
York Factory — offices in York Landing, Manitoba; registered population was 1,239.

References

External links
 Keewatin Tribal Council website 

 
Organizations based in Manitoba
First Nations in Manitoba
Thompson, Manitoba